Spetsnaz are Russian special forces.

Spetsnaz may also refer to:
Spetsnaz (band), a Swedish band
Spetsnaz (miniseries), a 2002 Russian TV miniseries
 The special forces of Ukraine

See also
Spetsnaz GRU, military formations under the control of the military intelligence service GRU